NGC 669 is an edge-on spiral galaxy with an active galactic nucleus located 200 million light-years away in the constellation Triangulum. NGC 669 was discovered by astronomer Édouard Stephan on November 28, 1883 and is a member of Abell 262.

See also
 List of NGC objects (1–1000)

References

External links

669
1248
6560
Triangulum (constellation)
Astronomical objects discovered in 1883
Spiral galaxies
Abell 262
Active galaxies